Oligobalia viettei is a species of moth of the family Tortricidae. It is found on Madagascar.

References

Moths described in 1988
Cochylini